Milton R. Loney (October 17, 1888 – April 1, 1957) was an American politician in the state of Washington. He served Washington House of Representatives from 1941 to 1957.

References

Republican Party members of the Washington House of Representatives
1888 births
1957 deaths
Politicians from Pendleton, Oregon
20th-century American politicians